

Francis Archibald Affleck (4 March 1950  –  7 February 1985) was a Canadian race car driver. He raced late model NASCAR as a hobby when he was living in the Montreal, Quebec suburb of Greenfield Park. He continued racing in NASCAR late models at local tracks and ARCA when he moved to Charlotte in 1977.

In practice for the ARCA 200 race at Daytona International Speedway on 7 February 1985 while traveling at an estimated 195 miles per hour, Affleck got his car sideways between turns 1 and 2, went airborne, and barrel-rolled end over end at least 7 or 8 times. The protective window netting on his car failed and Affleck was thrown partially out of his car and sustained head and neck injuries after being pinned under his Ford. Affleck's crash also changed the way that the protective window nettings are constructed on both NASCAR and ARCA cars to this very day. Francis Affleck became the first ARCA driver to be fatally injured at the Daytona International Speedway in its then 26-year history, and the first driver to be killed at the track since Ricky Knotts in 1980.

Affleck was the eldest of five children of Bill and Velma Affleck. He was survived by Kathleen, his wife of 15 years, and two sons.

Motorsports career results

NASCAR
(key) (Bold – Pole position awarded by qualifying time. Italics – Pole position earned by points standings or practice time. * – Most laps led.)

Busch Series

ARCA Talladega SuperCar Series
(key) (Bold – Pole position awarded by qualifying time. Italics – Pole position earned by points standings or practice time. * – Most laps led.)

See also
List of Daytona International Speedway fatalities

References

External links
 

1950 births
1985 deaths
People from Saint-Lambert, Quebec
Sportspeople from Montreal
Racing drivers from Quebec
NASCAR drivers
Canadian racing drivers
ARCA Menards Series drivers
Racing drivers who died while racing
Sports deaths in Florida